Agnes Benítez is a Puerto Rican beauty pageant titleholder.

Beauty Pageants

Miss Puerto Rico Universe 2009
On October 22, 2008, Agnes competed at the Miss Puerto Rico Universe 2009 pageant representing the state of Cataño. Agnes became one of the final six finalists in which she then placed as the 4th Runner-up.

Nuestra Belleza Latina 2009
In the spring of 2009 Agnes participated in Univision's reality contest Nuestra Belleza Latina 2009, where she placed as one of the twenty semi-finalists, but was eliminated right before the final twelve finalists were chosen.

Miss Tourism Queen International 2009
On August 28, 2009, Agnes competed at the Miss Tourism Queen International 2009  pageant representing her country Puerto Rico. Agnes became one of the twenty semi-finalists  and obtained the title of Continental Queen of Americas.

References

1986 births
Living people
Miss Earth 2011 contestants
People from Bayamón, Puerto Rico
Puerto Rican beauty pageant winners